Stoffels is a Dutch patronymic surname, meaning "son of Stoffel" (Christoffel). Notable people with the surname include:

Carolus Stoffels (1893–1957), Dutch modern pentathlete
Hendrickje Stoffels (1626–1663), Dutch artist's model, second partner of Rembrandt
Jannik Stoffels (born 1997), German footballer
Magdalena Stoffels (1993–2010), Namibian murder victim
Marianne Stoffels, Belgian chess player
Paul Stoffels (born 1962), Belgian physician
Roel Stoffels (born 1987), Dutch footballer

Dutch-language surnames
Patronymic surnames